Miguel Ángel Valdez (born June 7, 1991 in Torreon, Coahuila) is a Mexican footballer.

Club career

Club Tijuana
In 2010, Miguel started  playing for the Club Tijuana Xoloitzcuintles De Caliente. In 2010, he helped Tijuana obtain the Apertura 2010 champions. Then on May 21, 2011, his team advanced to the Primera División.

Titles

References

1991 births
Living people
Mexican footballers
Association football defenders
Club Tijuana footballers
Liga MX players